Going to Kansas City is a 1998 Canadian-Finnish drama film directed by Pekka Mandart. The film is about a male exchange student from Finland, who falls in love with an American girl, whose father does not accept the relationship. Shot in Canada, the film is set in the rural town of Canaan that is located 120 miles west of Kansas City.

Cast 
 Mikko Nousiainen as Mikko Vihavainen
 Melissa Galianos as Carly Malone
 Michael Ironside as Deputy Sheriff Mike Malone
 Susan Almgren as Bonnie Bruckner
 Daniel Pilon as Jack Bruckner
 Kris Holden-Ried as Charlie Bruckner
 Mark Camacho as Billy Ossining
 Karine Dion as Karen Olson
 Shawn Potter as Tink Kolchek
 Adam MacDonald as Floyd Weaver
Source:

Production 
The director Pekka Mandart adapted the idea of the story from a magazine article about a love story between a Finnish exchange student and an American girl.

Out of a total budget of 17 million Finnish markka (mk), 11 million mk came from the Canadian production company Telescene. The Finnish Film Foundation granted a three-million mk production support for Going to Kansas City. The total amount of production costs were 14,278,968 mk.

Reception 
Going to Kansas City had a total of 42,524 admissions in Finnish theatres.

The film was a nominee for the Best Music at the 1999 Jussi Awards and the National Council for Cinema of Finland awarded it a 100,000 mk Quality support for film productions.

References

External links 
 
 

1998 drama films
1998 films
Canadian drama films
English-language Canadian films
Films set in the United States
Films shot in Quebec
Finnish drama films
English-language Finnish films
1990s English-language films
1990s Canadian films